The Geike River is a river of Chile.

See also
List of rivers of Chile

Rivers of Chile
Rivers of Magallanes Region